Heeley Amateurs F.C. was an English association football club based in South Yorkshire. They competed in the Yorkshire Football League and FA Amateur Cup

History

League and cup history

References

Defunct football clubs in England
Defunct football clubs in South Yorkshire
Yorkshire Football League
East Midlands Regional League